Ivonaldo Viegas Dias Mendes (born 5 May 1993), simply known as Ivonaldo, is a São Toméan footballer who plays as a defender for UD Rei Amador and the São Tomé and Príncipe national team.

International career
Ivonaldo made his international debut for São Tomé and Príncipe in 2014.

References

1993 births
Living people
Association football defenders
São Tomé and Príncipe footballers
São Tomé and Príncipe international footballers
Sporting Praia Cruz players
UDRA players